Iyive, also referred to as Uive, Yiive, Ndir, Asumbos, is a severely endangered Bantoid language spoken in Nigeria and Cameroon. The ethnic group defined by use of this language is the Ndir.

General information

Iyive is an indigenous Tivoid language of the Cameroons close to Tiv proper. It is spoken in the Southwest Region in the Manyu division, northeast of Akwaya town on the Nigeria border, Yive village. Although they live in Cameroon, the majority of Iyive’s linguistic population has been forced to relocate to Nigeria due to conflict.

Official status

Iyive is severely endangered and has been classified as moribund as the language is only spoken by the older generation of Ndir and not passed down to younger generations. Iyive is not supported by any government bodies or institutions.

Writing system

Iyive is written using Latin script.

See also
 Endangered language
 Tivoid languages
 Cameroons
 Language death
 Nigeria

References

External links
Blench, R. M.  ‘’Language: Iyive’’, ‘’Glottolog’’, 2010
 
‘’Iyive’’, The Endangered language Project’’

Articles in class projects/Rutgers
Languages of Cameroon
Languages of Nigeria
Tivoid languages
Endangered Niger–Congo languages
Endangered languages of Africa